The Anglican Diocese of Ibadan is one of 17 within the Anglican Province of Ibadan, itself one of 14 provinces within the Church of Nigeria. The current bishop is Joseph Akinfenwa. The Cathedral of St James the Great (Oke-bola Ibadan), is the seat of the Bishop of the Diocese of Ibadan.

Notes

Church of Nigeria dioceses
Dioceses of the Province of Ibadan